Spencer is a 2021 historical psychological drama film directed by Pablo Larraín from a screenplay by Steven Knight. The film is about Princess Diana's existential crisis during the Christmas of 1991, as she considers divorcing Prince Charles and leaving the British royal family. Kristen Stewart and Jack Farthing star as Diana and Charles respectively, joined by Timothy Spall, Sean Harris, and Sally Hawkins.

Spencer premiered at the 78th Venice International Film Festival on 3 September 2021, and was theatrically released in the United Kingdom and the United States on 5 November 2021. The film was not successful at the box office, grossing $24.9 million on an $18 million budget. It received generally positive reviews from critics, with Stewart's performance garnering widespread acclaim. For portraying Diana, Stewart was nominated for the Academy Award, Golden Globe Award, and Critics' Choice Movie Award for Best Actress.

Plot
On Christmas Eve 1991, the British royal family prepares to spend the Christmas holidays at the Queen's Sandringham estate in Norfolk. Among the attendees is Diana, Princess of Wales, whose marriage to Prince Charles has become strained due to his affair with Camilla Parker Bowles. The staff of Sandringham prepare for the royals' arrival, and Diana drives around the Norfolk countryside. On the verge of a breakdown, she avoids heading to Sandringham until running into Royal Head Chef Darren McGrady. She notes that the long-abandoned neighbouring estate, Park House, used to be her childhood home. Then she notices a scarecrow in the distance and eagerly runs towards it with a nostalgic expression. Diana takes off its jacket, which once belonged to her father John Spencer, 8th Earl Spencer, and goes back to her car.

When Diana arrives at Sandringham, her sons William and Harry are excited to see her, but she does not attempt to socialise with the royal family, who mostly ignore her. Diana's only friend at the Estate is Royal Dresser Maggie, who encourages her to both combat the royal family and fulfil the obligations expected of her. Diana finds a book on Anne Boleyn in her assigned bedroom. She begins to have dreams about Boleyn (including a hallucination of her at a Christmas Eve dinner where she imagines herself destroying a pearl necklace given to her by Charles and eating the pearls in her soup), eventually coming to believe that Boleyn's ghost is haunting her in her capacity as a fellow abandoned royal wife. Diana tries to visit her childhood home, but she is stopped by royal guards, who initially mistake her for an intruder.

On Christmas Day, Diana attends the service at St Mary Magdalene Church, Sandringham, where she notices Camilla among the gathered crowd and is photographed by numerous intrusive journalists. She holds a difficult conversation with Charles, who rebuffs her concern over William and Harry's participation in a pheasant shoot the next day and advises her to develop a stronger sense of separation between her public and private lives. Charles privately arranges for Maggie to be sent to London and spreads rumours that she had planted the Boleyn book in Diana's room and made critical comments about her mental health; McGrady denies that she had done so when Diana questions him. Major Gregory attempts to encourage Diana to conform to the pressures of royal life by reminding her that the soldiers of the British Army die attempting to protect the interests of the Crown (and by extension her interests). Diana responds by stating that she never asked anyone to die for her and accuses him of planting the Boleyn book in her room as a warning, which he denies. After imagining wounding herself with a pair of wire cutters given to her by McGrady, Diana avoids the formal Christmas Day dinner, instead running to her childhood home and gaining access to it with the wire cutters. Memories of her happier girlhood overtake her, and she dances from room to room while imagining her younger selves. She considers committing suicide by throwing herself down a flight of stairs, but the hallucination of Boleyn stops her. Instead, she rips apart her pearl necklace.

On Boxing Day, Diana wakes up in her room to find that Maggie has been called back from London. The two travel to a nearby beach, where Diana talks about her mental and marital problems. Maggie responds by confessing that she is in love with Diana. After bidding Maggie farewell, Diana goes to the pheasant shoot, walks out in front of the crowd of hunters, and announces that she is taking William and Harry to London, to which Charles reluctantly agrees. Diana bids farewell to McGrady and Major Gregory returns the Boleyn book to the library. As they drive away, Diana and her children sing along to the song "All I Need Is a Miracle" by Mike and the Mechanics, passing the scarecrow again, now dressed in one of Diana's outfits. They drive to London, where they order KFC and eat by the River Thames. Diana looks across the river, uncertain of her future but no longer feeling burdened by royal responsibility.

Cast

Production
On 17 June 2020, it was announced that Pablo Larraín would direct Spencer, a film starring Kristen Stewart as Princess Diana. On 26 June 2020, it was reported that Neon had acquired the rights to distribute the film in the United States in a deal worth more than $4 million. STX Entertainment and DCM Film Distribution will distribute in the United Kingdom and Germany.

Filming began at the Schlosshotel Kronberg, Germany, in January 2021 with Timothy Spall, Sally Hawkins, and Sean Harris joining the cast. Other filming locations were the Schloss Marquardt in Marquardt, north of the city of Potsdam, and Nordkirchen Castle, the moated castle. On 25 March, production moved to the UK for the final stretch of filming, with Jack Farthing joining the cast as Prince Charles, and the film wrapped on 27 April 2021.

Filming 
The film was shot on both Kodak Super 16mm and 35mm film stock by cinematographer Claire Mathon using the Arricam LT, and Arriflex 416 Plus. To achieve the film's specific look, she used a combination of Leitz Summilux and Zeiss Ultra 16 lenses. 

In an interview with Kodak, Mathon said that shooting on film was their obvious choice, calling it a "necessity" and that "there was never a question about shooting digital or film". According to her, the only question was whether they would shoot the film in 16mm or 35mm film stock. She also revealed that she and Larraín reviewed sequences from various Stanley Kubrick films such as Barry Lyndon (1975) and A Clockwork Orange (1971) to learn about the style of camera movement, rhythm of the shots, and the use of short focal lenses. 

Most of the film was shot on Super 16mm film format due to the lightness, and ergonomics of the equipment used while also revealing that economic advantages is also part of the reason. In some scenes where they want to minimize the grain, they opted for the 35mm film stock as it retains both softness and details on the darker part of the image. 

Film processing and 4K 16-bit scans were done at Hiventy in Paris, while the cameras was supported by Arri Rental in Berlin, Germany.

Music

Jonny Greenwood composed the score. The score was released by Mercury KX on 12 November 2021. Writing for the You Discover Music website, Sharon Kelly described the soundtrack, stating: "Jonny Greenwood’s genre bending music for the Spencer soundtrack combines free jazz and classical baroque."

Release
Spencer had its world premiere in competition at the Venice International Film Festival. It then screened at film festivals in Telluride, Toronto, London, Philadelphia, San Diego and Zurich.

The film was theatrically released in the United Kingdom and the United States on 5 November 2021.  It was the last film to be distributed by STX Entertainment in the United Kingdom before the distributor's UK division was shut down on July 28, 2022.

Reception

Box office
Spencer grossed $7.1 million in the United States and Canada, and $16.9 million in other territories, for a worldwide total of $24 million.

In the United States and Canada, Spencer made $2.1 million from 996 theatres in its opening weekend. In its second weekend, the film played in 1,265 theatres and made $1.53 million.

Critical response

Upon the teaser trailer's release, Forbes reported that the role "thrusts" Stewart "into the Oscar race" for the Academy Award for Best Actress. After the film's world premiere, Variety also stated, "There's already been plenty of talk in Venice that the role will likely land Stewart her first Oscar nomination." The film received a three-minute standing ovation at its world premiere, with critics lauding Stewart's performance as Diana.

On review aggregator Rotten Tomatoes, 83% of 350 critics have given the film a positive review, with an average rating of 7.6/10. The website's critics consensus reads: "Spencer can frustrate with its idiosyncratic depiction of its subject's life, but Kristen Stewart's finely modulated performance anchors the film's flights of fancy." On Metacritic, the film has a weighted average score of 76 out of 100, based on 53 critics, indicating "generally favorable reviews".

David Rooney of The Hollywood Reporter stated that the film "rests on Stewart's shoulders and she commits to the film's slightly bonkers excesses as much as to its moments of delicate illumination" and wrote that "[not] everything lands in Spencer, and I often wondered if the film was so set on bucking convention that it would alienate its audience. But it tells a sorrowful story we all think we know in a new and genuinely disturbing light." Reviewing the film for The Daily Telegraph, Robbie Collin wrote: "The 31-year-old Stewart – who will be instantly and justifiably awards-tipped for this – navigates this perilous terrain with total mastery, getting the voice and mannerisms just right but vamping everything up just a notch, in order to better lean into the film's melodramatic, paranoiac and absurdist swerves." Drawing comparisons between the film and the Jacqueline Kennedy biopic Jackie (2016), also directed by Larraín, Pete Hammond of Deadline Hollywood stated that "Spencer is something else indeed, almost playing out in a conventional dramatic fashion, a more accessible approach in some ways, but also more ambitious as it is squarely from the point of view of its title character, purposely called Spencer to assure us that the person who once was, is well on the way to finding that very lost spirit again before it is too late."

Spencer was listed on many critics' top ten lists for 2021.

Response of Princess Diana's staff 
Stewart's portrayal of Diana was hailed as one of the most accurate portrayals of the late Princess. Ken Wharfe, Diana's former bodyguard, commented, "Out of all the people who have played Diana over the past 10 years, she's the closest to her. She managed to perfect her mannerisms." Former Royal Chef Darren McGrady, who was portrayed by actor Sean Harris in the film, said, "Kristen Stewart is amazing as the princess, with her mannerisms and her voice ... the happy scenes of her with the boys, it was like her coming alive again. For real, Kristen Stewart played an amazing part." However, McGrady also pointed out that the film took considerable liberties, especially with its use of metaphors, but acknowledged that the film was a fictionalised take on what possibly could have happened.

Accolades

References

External links

 
 
 
 Official screenplay

2020s English-language films
2021 drama films
2020s psychological drama films
American Christmas drama films
American psychological drama films
British Christmas drama films
British psychological drama films
English-language German films
English-language Chilean films
German Christmas drama films
German psychological drama films
Chilean Christmas films
Chilean drama films
Cultural depictions of the British Royal Family
Cultural depictions of Anne Boleyn
Cultural depictions of Charles III
Cultural depictions of Prince Harry, Duke of Sussex
Cultural depictions of William, Prince of Wales
Cultural depictions of Elizabeth II
Films about British royalty
Films about Diana, Princess of Wales
Films about eating disorders
Films about depression
Films directed by Pablo Larraín
Films with screenplays by Steven Knight
Films scored by Jonny Greenwood
Films set in country houses
Films set in London
Films set in Norfolk
Films shot in Hesse
Films shot in Nordrhein-Westfalen
Films shot in Potsdam
Films set in 1991
FilmNation Entertainment films
Films about mother–son relationships
Neon (distributor) films
Topic Studios films
Films impacted by the COVID-19 pandemic
2020s American films
2020s British films
2020s avant-garde and experimental films